John Young Brown (February 1, 1900 – June 16, 1985) was an American attorney and politician. He was a state representative for nearly three decades, serving one term as speaker of the Kentucky House of Representatives and as majority floor leader during the term of Governor Edward T. Breathitt. He was elected to one term in the U.S. House of Representatives from March 4, 1933, to January 3, 1935, to an at-large seat elected statewide on a general ticket. He was an unsuccessful candidate for the Democratic nomination for Governor of Kentucky in 1939 and the unsuccessful candidate for the United States Senate in 1946 and 1966. He was a member of the Democratic Party.

Biography

Brown was the son of tenant farmers Jesse C. and Lucy Keeper Brown, who named him after John Young Brown, a former governor and neighbor. He was born on a farm near Geiger Lake, Union County, Kentucky, attended Union County schools and graduated from the high school at Sturgis, Kentucky. He graduated from Centre College at Danville, Kentucky with an A.B. degree in 1921 where he was a member of Phi Kappa Tau fraternity and a "Scrub" player on the famous Centre Praying Colonels football team. He received his LL.B. degree from University of Kentucky College of Law in 1926 and was admitted to the bar that same year.

He was a well-known trial lawyer who practiced law from 1926 to 1985 in Lexington, Kentucky, with three firms: Brown and Miller, Brown and Son, and Brown, Sledd and McCann. He was noted for his extensive quotation of the Bible from memory during his summations to juries.

Brown sponsored much legislation in the Kentucky House of Representatives including the state's first sales tax and civil rights legislation. He was recognized on many occasions as the most effective legislator in the House.

Personal life
Brown married Dorothy Inman in March 1929 in New Albany, Indiana. They had five children: Dorothy Ann, Betty, John Y. Jr., Diane, and Pamela. They divorced in 1973 after repeated political campaigns strained their relationship. Their son, John Y. Brown Jr., made a large fortune as the owner of Kentucky Fried Chicken and was Kentucky governor from 1979 to 1983. Their daughter Pamela died in 1970 in an ill-fated attempt to cross the Atlantic Ocean in a balloon dubbed "The Free Life." He is also the grandfather of former Kentucky Secretary of State John Y. Brown III and news anchor Pamela Brown.

Brown died of pneumonia in Louisville, six months after being paralyzed from the waist down in an automobile accident.

Legacy
Brown is a member of the University of Kentucky College of Law's Hall of Fame and the Phi Kappa Tau Hall of Fame.

References

External links
 
 

|-

|-

1900 births
1985 deaths
20th-century American lawyers
20th-century American politicians
Brown family of Kentucky
Centre College alumni
Deaths from pneumonia in Kentucky
Democratic Party members of the United States House of Representatives from Kentucky
Kentucky lawyers
Democratic Party members of the Kentucky House of Representatives
People from Union County, Kentucky
People with paraplegia
University of Kentucky College of Law alumni